Memorial Drive Park, more generally referred to as "Memorial Drive", is a tennis venue, located adjacent to the Adelaide Oval, in the park lands surrounding the centre of Adelaide, South Australia. Memorial Drive took its name from the winding avenue, known as War Memorial Drive, which separates the venue from the River Torrens.

History
The Memorial Drive Tennis club was established in 1914, under the name South Australian Lawn Tennis Club. About  of land were leased to the club directly adjacent to the Adelaide Oval and the grass courts were opened in October 1921 by the Governor of South Australia, Sir Archibald Weigall. Gerald Patterson won the first South Australian Men's Singles Championship staged at the venue in 1922, the same year in which he also won Wimbledon for the second time. The following year, a clubhouse and grandstand were erected at Memorial Drive, the northern grandstand being the former stand from Adelaide Oval, which was dismantled and then reassembled. In 1938 a large permanent grandstand was erected on the northern side of the courts.

Over the years many major events have been held on the grass courts including the Davis Cup and Australian Open Championships. In 1926 the Australian men's singles title was staged at the courts for the first time, won by John Hawkes. Adelaide hosted a total of fourteen Australian championships until 1967, twelve of which were played at Memorial Drive. In 1938 American Donald Budge won the first leg of the first Grand Slam in tennis at Memorial Drive by defeating Australia's John Bromwich.

In January 1933 Australia played a tennis Test match against the United States. American champion Ellsworth Vines made his only appearance in Adelaide and among the Australian representatives were Harry Hopman, Adrian Quist, and John Bromwich. The following year, international matches featured the English champion Fred Perry.

Adelaide's first exposure to professional tennis involved the French dual Wimbledon champion Henri Cochet in contests against local professionals in 1935. In 1958 Pancho Gonzalez and Lew Hoad appeared at Memorial Drive as part of Jack Kramer's professional troupe. From 1974 until 2008 the Adelaide International tournament was played at Memorial Drive, and between 2009 and 2019 the World Tennis Challenge exhibition was played there.

Memorial Drive last hosted the Australian Open in 1967, with Roy Emerson winning the Men's singles, Nancy Richey Gunter the Women's singles, John Newcombe and Tony Roche the Men's doubles, Lesley Turner Bowrey and Judy Tegart Dalton winning the Women's doubles, and Turner Bowrey and Owen Davidson the Mixed doubles.

2019–22 redevelopments
In February 2019, the South Australian Government announced funding of $10 million to construct a canopy-roof structure over Memorial Drive Park, to prepare the venue to host the new Adelaide International, the first ATP sanctioned event in the city since the Adelaide International in 2008 and the first ever WTA event. Additional minor redevelopments in the precinct allowed Memorial Drive to host the inaugural tournament in January 2020, held one week prior to the first Grand Slam of the year, the Australian Open. Later that year the government announced $44 million would be spent on constructing two new permanent grandstands surrounding the main court, one replacing the northern grandstand and increasing the capacity of the centre to 6,500 patrons. Additional developments include upgrades to the centre's media and broadcast facilities, sports training and development spaces, and function spaces, and integrating the eastern facility with the Adelaide Oval southern plaza. The redevelopment is due for completion in mid-2022.

Concerts
Elton John - 1971, 1982, 1984 and 1990
Led Zeppelin - 19 February 1972
The Bee Gees - 1972
The Rolling Stones - 20–21 February 1973
Black Sabbath and Status Quo - 1974
Slade - 1974
Uriah Heep - 23 November 1974, with Cold Chisel
The Skyhooks - 21 December 1974, with Ayers Rock, Daddy Cool, Matt Taylor and Cold Chisel and 20 December 1975
Joe Cocker - 26 February 1975, with Cold Chisel
5KA Concert - 8 March 1975 - The Skyhooks, with Sherbet
Eric Clapton - 26 April 1975
Deep Purple - 27 November 1975, with Cold Chisel & 30 November 1984
Jeff Beck - Jan Hammer - February 1977
Devo - 1980
The Police - 24 February 1981
AC/DC - 1981
Cold Chisel - 11–12 September 1982
Dire Straits - 17-18 March 1983
Duran Duran - 25 November 1983 originally scheduled for the 24th and swapped to the 25th 
Midnight Oil - 2 November 1984, 23 November 1985 and 10 October 2002 (M-One Festival)
Rod Stewart - 4 February 1985
Phil Collins - 17 April 1985 and 31 March 1990
Bob Dylan - 1986, with Tom Petty and the Heartbreakers
ZZ Top - 1987, with Rose Tattoo
George Michael - 11–12 March 1988
INXS - 2 October 1985 (http://inxsonline.com/gigography/), 21 & 22 October 1988 (http://inxsonline.com/gigography/), 19 & 20 April 1991 (http://inxsonline.com/gigography/)
Stevie Wonder - November 3 1987 
Sting - 11 November 1988
U2 - 27–28 October 1989, with B.B. King and Weddings Parties Anything
Bon Jovi - 11 November 1989
Fleetwood Mac - 1990
Aerosmith - 29 September 1990
Cher - 14 November 1990
Kylie Minogue - 15 February 1991
Pearl Jam - 8 March 1995, with The Meanies
KISS - 11 February 1997, with Alice in Chains
New Found Glory - 5 April 2002
Garbage - 10 October 2002
Carlos Santana - 2003
New York Dolls - 2007
Jack Johnson - 27 March 2008, with Matt Costa & Will Connor
Kings of Leon - 11 March 2009
Powderfinger - 16 September, with Jet and Yves Klein Blue and 30 October 2010, with Jet and Andrew Morris Duo

See also
Adelaide Entertainment Centre
Adelaide Festival Centre
Adelaide Oval
Adelaide Jubilee Oval
Thebarton Theatre
 List of tennis stadiums by capacity

References

External links
 
 

Tennis venues in Australia
1921 establishments in Australia
Sports venues in Adelaide
Sports venues completed in 1921
Music venues in Australia
Adelaide Park Lands
1952 Davis Cup
1956 Davis Cup
1963 Davis Cup
1968 Davis Cup